Cerrito, Cerritos, El Cerrito, or Los Cerritos may refer to:

Places

Argentina 
 El Cerrito, Catamarca
 Isla del Cerrito, an island in Chaco Province

Brazil 
 Cerrito, Rio Grande do Sul
 São José do Cerrito, state of Santa Catarina

Colombia 
 Cerrito, Santander
 El Cerrito, Valle del Cauca

Mexico 
 Cerritos, San Luis Potosí
 El Cerrito archaeological site in Querétaro.
 Los Cerritos beach, in El Pescadero, Baja California Sur

Panama 
 Los Cerritos, Panama

Paraguay 
 Cerrito, Paraguay, a city in the Ñeembucú Department

United States 
 Cerritos, California, a city in Los Angeles County
 Cerrito Creek, California
 El Cerrito, California, a city in Contra Costa County
 El Cerrito, Riverside County, California
 El Cerrito, San Diego, California
 Los Cerritos, Long Beach, California
 Los Cerritos, Colorado
 El Cerrito, New Mexico

Uruguay 
 Cerrito, Montevideo

People

Surname Cerrito 
 Doug Cerrito (born 1969), American musician
 Fanny Cerrito (1817–1909), Italian dancer and choreographer

Surname Cerritos 
 Alexis Cerritos (born 2000), Salvadoran footballer
 Ronald Cerritos (born 1975), Salvadoran footballer

Schools 
 Cerritos College, Norwalk, California, United States
 Cerritos High School, Cerritos, California, United States
 El Cerrito High School, El Cerrito, California, United States

Other uses 
 Battle of Cerrito, part of the Argentine War of Independence
 Club Sportivo Cerrito, a football club in Montevideo, Uruguay
 USS Cerritos - a starship in the TV series Star Trek: Lower Decks

See also
Cerreto (disambiguation)
Cerro (disambiguation)